Chris Rodriguez is an American contemporary Christian musician and singer/songwriter.

Biography
Rodriguez was born in The Bronx on March 7, 1960, and moved to Nashville, becoming a veteran of the scene in the early 1990s. He sang jingles for fast food companies and worked as a backup singer and guitarist in Christian music, country music, and pop, appearing on recordings by Michael Bolton, Steven Curtis Chapman, Vince Gill, Amy Grant, Faith Hill, Billy Joel, Wynonna Judd, Kenny Loggins, Michael McDonald, Rich Mullins, Dolly Parton, Michael W. Smith, Shania Twain, and Jaci Velasquez. He also worked as a songwriter, with credits including "Help You Find Your Way" by Michael W. Smith.

His debut album, Beggar's Paradise, was released by Word Records in 1999 and was produced by Brent Bourgeois. The album was described as "somewhere between pop-ified country and layered folk" by the Richmond Times-Dispatch and "a '60s/'70s pop primer worth studying" by the Dayton Daily News. CCM lauded his "commitment not to paint by the numbers" in his songwriting.

He continues to work as a session musician with other artists on the Nashville scene, such as Kenny Rogers, Kenny Loggins, and Lee Ann Womack. Rodriguez also leads Nashville-based band The Alternators, which features Nashville session players that interchange as their schedules allow.

Rodriguez is divorced and has two children, Nicole and Andre.

Rodriguez was part of Shania Twain's "The Woman in Me" TV tour band 1995-96 performing selected international venues and television shows with the musicians Randy Thomas (co-writer of the song "Butterfly Kisses"), Dan Schafer, Russ Taff, Dave Malachowski, Marc Muller, Allison Cornell & Will Owsley.

From 2005 to 2010, he toured with Keith Urban, and in 2010-11 he toured with LeAnn Rimes. He also toured with Kenny Loggins in the period 2007–2010. In 2011, Rodriguez was working with Don Moen and new artist Jessica Ridley. In 2012, Rodriguez played rhythm guitar for Faith Hill and Kelly Clarkson on tour. Rodriguez performed backing vocals on several Megadeth albums, including The System Has Failed (2004),  United Abominations (2007), Endgame (2009), Thirteen (2011) and Dystopia (2016).

From 2015, Rodriguez has been a touring member with Peter Cetera. He also performed some duets with Cetera, such as "Hard Habit to Break".

Discography

Solo

Beggar's Paradise (1999)
Paraíso de un Mendigo (1999) [10-track Spanish version of the 12-track Beggar's Paradise]
Head, Hands and Heart: Songs from the Venus Pool - Volume One (2019)

References

American session musicians
Living people
1960 births